Conostomium is a genus of flowering plants in the family Rubiaceae. The genus is found from Ethiopia to South Africa.

Species
Conostomium gazense Verdc. — Mozambique
Conostomium longitubum (Beck) Cufod. — Djibouti, Ethiopia, Somalia, Kenya
Conostomium natalense (Hochst.) Bremek. — Mozambique, Zimbabwe, South Africa
Conostomium quadrangulare (Rendle) Cufod. — Ethiopia, Sudan, Kenya, Uganda
Conostomium zoutpansbergense (Bremek.) Bremek. — Mozambique, Transvaal

References

External links
Conostomium in the World Checklist of Rubiaceae

Rubiaceae genera
Spermacoceae